Drake's Progress was a British sketch show that aired on BBC Television from 1957 to 1958. It was co-written by comedian Charlie Drake, who was also the show's lead performer.

Cast
Charlie Drake
Irene Handl (series 1)
Warren Mitchell (series 1)
Willoughby Goddard (series 1)
Valentine Dyall (series 2)

Episodes
Drake's Progress aired for two series and a total of twelve 30 minute episodes. Both the first and second series broadcast on Mondays at 8.00pm, with the series one airing fortnightly. None of the episodes exist in the BBC archives and are lost.

Series One

Series Two

References

External links

1950s British television sketch shows
1957 British television series debuts
1958 British television series endings
BBC television sketch shows
English-language television shows
Lost BBC episodes